Wireless Group Limited is a radio and digital broadcasting network with headquarters in Belfast, Northern Ireland and with radio operations in the Republic of Ireland and the United Kingdom. It currently operates five stations in Ireland and 18 in the UK. The company was formerly known as UTV Media, owned by UTV Television. Its television broadcasting services were sold to ITV plc in February 2016 and its radio, sales services and websites were spun off into a new company, Wireless, later purchased by News Corp.

In June 2016, Rupert Murdoch's News Corp reached an agreement to buy the company. The sale was completed in September 2016. Prior to the acquisition, Wireless Group was a constituent of the FTSE SmallCap Index.

History

Background

The current UTV Limited (originally Ulster Television plc), which began in 1959 as an ITV franchise holder in Northern Ireland, purchased ISP Direct Net Access in March 2000 for £4.4m, rebranding it as UTV Internet and later UTV Connect. The service expanded into telephone market under UTV Talk in August 2004 and also provided broadband and fibre optic packages for Northern Ireland, the Republic and the rest of the UK. The service was sold to Rainbow Communications and Vodafone Ireland in 2014.

The company also set up an online car dealership UTV Drive, created in partnership with Abbey Insurance, which was sold in 2014.

Further expansion took place with the move into radio, starting in Cork with 96FM and C103 in 2001. Further acquisitions were undertaken over the next decade, with the largest investment being the purchase of The Wireless Group in 2005 for £97m, boosting its radio portfolio with additional local stations, digital radio multiplexes and national station Talksport. In 2005, the group also launched its first station, U105, which broadcasts to the Belfast area, and purchased Juice FM in Liverpool .

With the expansion, turnover increased, with 2005 being up 46% on 2004, pre-tax profits rising by 12%, and employment up by 500 people to more than double the figure in the previous year. In 2006, total sales were £113.6m of which the radio division accounted for 54%, television 37% and 9% from new media. 48% of operating profits were earned in the radio side of the business, with 47% derived from television and 5% from new media.

Reorganisation of UTV and proposed mergers
Following shareholder approval, Ulster Television plc changed its name to UTV plc in June 2006. Then, on 16 August 2007, a re-organisation of the group was proposed, with the existing UTV plc, holding the ITV franchise only, becoming a wholly owned subsidiary of new holding company, UTV Media plc, and the remaining businesses transferred to the new holding company. The change was approved at an extraordinary general meeting on 19 September and came into effect on 15 October 2007, with shareholders receiving a 1:1 exchange of stock from the old to new company. The company, established on 1 June 2007 as Beechgrove Trading Limited, changed its name to UTV Media Limited on 13 August 2007, and to UTV Media plc on 21 August 2007.

In August and September 2006, the company made two merger proposals to STV Group plc, operator of the northern and central Scottish ITV franchises as STV. The latter proposal would have given SMG shareholders 52% of the merged company. On 20 September 2006, the plans were abandoned after SMG rejected the offer as unacceptable. However, on 10 January 2007, the two companies announced that they had agreed a merger, with SMG shareholders to receive 46% of the merged company and UTV 54%. After the details were expected to be finalised before the end of January, the deal was put on hold and then called off by SMG on 28 February 2007.

UTV Ireland and further radio expansion
In January 2015, the company launched UTV Ireland, carrying many of ITV's programming including Coronation Street and Emmerdale, which had been previously broadcast in Ireland by TV3. The station produces some home-grown programming, including the twice-nightly national news programme Ireland Live.

On 27 March 2015, it was confirmed that Sound Digital, which was 30% owned by the company, had been successful in its bid for the second national digital radio multiplex in the UK, which would be launched in 2016. As part of the bid, the company would expand its Talksport station with new sister stations Talksport 2 and Talkradio, as well as running a relaunched Virgin Radio UK. The multiplex was launched on 29 February 2016, with the new stations launching over the following month less talkBUSINESS, which was replaced by Share Radio on the multiplex.

Sale of UTV to ITV plc
On 19 October 2015, it was announced that ITV plc would acquire UTV's ITV franchise and UTV Ireland for £100 million, subject to regulatory approval. UTV retained its radio operations, but was required to rename itself after including the UTV brand in the sale.

The sale to ITV plc was completed on 29 February 2016, when the company also rebranded as Wireless Group plc. On 30 June 2016 Rupert Murdoch's News Corp announced an agreement to purchase the company for all-cash worth between $220–296 million. The sale was completed on 26 September 2016.

Financial Results
In May 2019, it was reported that Wireless Radio (ROI) Ltd last year recorded pre-tax losses of €2.23m and this followed pre-tax losses of €4.33m for the preceding 18 months.

Operations
The company splits its operations into three divisions, Radio GB, Radio Ireland and Digital.

Radio GB
Formed from the original Wireless Group purchase, the division has its origins from Talk Radio, the owner of the station of the same name, later renamed Talksport in 2000. A consortium including MVI, News International, Radio Investments and LMC Radio, headed by chief executive Kelvin MacKenzie, under the name TalkCo, purchased the group in 1998 for £15.5m. The company expanded when it purchased The Radio Partnership in 1999, gaining control of its nine local commercial stations and becoming the fifth largest radio company in the UK.

On 8 February 2019, it was announced that the local stations would be sold to Bauer Radio.

National
 talkSPORT
 talkSPORT 2
 talkRADIO
 Times Radio (jointly with The Times and The Sunday Times)

 Virgin Radio UK
DAB multiplexes
 Sound Digital (with Bauer Radio and Arqiva)

Radio Ireland

Local stations
 Dublin's Q102 
 FM104 
 Cork's 96FM 
 C103 

 Live95 
 LMFM 
 U105

Other divisions
The company published a free, London-based men's magazine called Sport until 2017.

Wireless Group also owns the digital agency Zesty and the internet hosting provider Tibus.

References

External links
 

 
Companies formerly listed on the London Stock Exchange
Companies formerly listed on Euronext Dublin
Communications in the United Kingdom
Telecommunications companies of Ireland
Television in Northern Ireland
Mass media companies of Northern Ireland
Mass media in Belfast
News Corporation subsidiaries
Companies based in Belfast
2016 mergers and acquisitions